The 2020 United States presidential election in Utah was held on Tuesday, November 3, 2020, as part of the 2020 United States presidential election in which all 50 states plus the District of Columbia participated. Utah voters chose electors to represent them in the Electoral College via a popular vote, pitting the Republican Party's nominee, incumbent President Donald Trump, and running mate Vice President Mike Pence against Democratic Party nominee, former Vice President Joe Biden, and his running mate California Senator Kamala Harris. Utah has six electoral votes in the Electoral College.

Prior to the election, all 14 news organizations projected Utah as leaning towards Trump, or a safe red state. Throughout the campaign, Trump did not exceed 60% in a single poll conducted. Some polls even showed the president leading by single digits against Biden, likely indicating a closer than normal contest in this traditionally Republican stronghold. Trump won Utah with 58.1% of the vote and a margin of 20.5%, an improvement on his 18.1% margin over Hillary Clinton in 2016, but still relatively narrow compared with past Republican nominees in the modern age. He performed strongly in rural areas, as well as in some larger counties like Utah (Provo), Davis (Farmington), and Weber (Ogden). Trump improved over his 45.5% plurality win in 2016, due in part to the lack of a strong third party presence, as Evan McMullin, who endorsed Biden, earned 21.5% of the vote that year. The election was far more of a two-party contest in 2020, with third parties receiving 4.2% of the vote, compared to 27% in 2016. Despite this, the Associated Press reported a less partisan and more cooperative cultural environment in Utah compared to other states during the election.

With no major third-party challenges, Trump improved his vote share by 13% while Biden improved on Hillary Clinton's 2016 results by 10.3 percentage points. Biden's improvement garnered him the highest percentage by a Democratic presidential nominee in Utah since Lyndon Johnson won with 54.9% of the vote in 1964, as Biden overtook the vote shares of Hubert Humphrey in 1968, Barack Obama in 2008, and Jimmy Carter in 1976 (the only other Democratic nominees to surpass a third of the state's vote since 1964). Biden's greatest support came from Salt Lake County, the state's most populous county, where he won 53.7%, the first outright majority for a Democratic nominee in the county since Johnson in 1964. Biden also won Summit County (Park City), which, along with Salt Lake, was one of two counties in the state Hillary Clinton had carried in 2016 (and the only one where she had won a majority); and he flipped Grand County (Moab), which had voted Democratic in 1992 and 2008.

Per exit polls by the Associated Press, Trump's strength in Utah came from Mormons. 53% of voters identified as Mormons, and Trump received 72% of their votes. Trump also won the suburban areas, which make up 57% of the state, with 54% of the vote.

Utah is also one of the 7 states (along with Arkansas, Nevada, California, Illinois, Florida, and Hawaii) as well as the District of Columbia in which Trump’s margin increased from 2016.

Primary elections

Republican primary

The Republican primary was held on March 3, 2020. Utah politicians Jon Huntsman and Mitt Romney both declined to run against Trump.

Democratic primary

The Democratic primary was held on March 3, 2020. Elizabeth Warren, Bernie Sanders, and former Vice President Joe Biden were among the major declared candidates.

General election

Predictions

Polling

Graphical summary

Aggregate polls

Polls

with Donald Trump and Michael Bloomberg

with Donald Trump and Cory Booker

with Donald Trump and Pete Buttigieg

with Donald Trump and Kamala Harris

with Donald Trump and Amy Klobuchar

with Donald Trump and Beto O'Rourke

with Donald Trump and Bernie Sanders

with Donald Trump and Elizabeth Warren

with Donald Trump and Generic Democrat

with Donald Trump and Generic Opponent

Results

Results by county

Counties that flipped from Republican to Democratic
 Grand (largest municipality: Moab)

By congressional district
Trump won all four congressional districts.

See also
 United States presidential elections in Utah
 Presidency of Joe Biden
 2020 United States presidential election
 2020 Democratic Party presidential primaries
 2020 Republican Party presidential primaries
 2020 United States elections

Notes

References

External links
 
 
  (state affiliate of the U.S. League of Women Voters)
 

Utah
2020
Presidential